Modar Alaoui is a Moroccan-American serial entrepreneur based in Silicon Valley, California in the United States. He is mostly known for his work in the field of Artificial Intelligence and Computer Vision-based face analytics and emotion recognition technologies. Alaoui is the founder and CEO of Eyeris Technologies, Inc., a Deep Learning-based face analytics and emotion recognition software.

Early life 
Alaoui was born in Fez, Morocco and then moved to Montréal to complete his education from HEC Montréal and subsequently from Concordia University. He received an Integrated Marketing Communications degree with a concentration on User Behavioral Measurement. While in Concordia University, Alaoui founded AIM Banking Solutions; a FinTech startup that sold debit and credit card terminals to merchants and negotiated card processing rates on their behalf. He later sold the company and moved to the United States.

Career 
Upon completing his education at Concordia University, Alaoui moved to the United States where he worked for Dell for two years and subsequently joined InVision. Two years later, the company was purchased by AudioVox and Alaoui left the company. In March 2008, he founded Eyeris TV, the first US facial recognition-measured in-store TV network franchise. The company targeted short-bite video content and advertisements in real-time based on viewers' gender and age group.

The company won several awards including The Innovation and technology award presented by the Florida Business Expo. In 2011, the company invested in a small R&D project that aimed at developing emotion recognition from facial microexpressions among other face analytics beyond age and gender recognition.

After relocating the company to Silicon Valley in 2013, the company adopted Deep Learning techniques based on Convolutional Neural Networks for face analytics and then pivoted into Eyeris Technologies, Inc. The company's flagship product, EmoVu, is a software that reads people's facial micro-expressions in real-time using regular camera sensors. The company works today with embedded system manufacturers including car makers,  social robotics and camera-enabled IoT devices. In Automotive ADAS, the company integrates EmoVu DMS, an automotive-grade driver monitoring AI that measures drivers' inattention, cognitive awareness and emotional distraction. In Social Robotics, Eyeris enables the next generation of Robot-Human Interaction by integrating its software and enabling OTA updates. Eyeris also integrates its embeddable software into camera-enabled IoT devices.  

Alaoui is a frequent keynoter on Ambient Intelligence and a winner of several technology and innovation awards. He is also an advisor to several startups including Veylinx, Ersatz Lab and Trans-Robotics.

References 

Concordia University alumni
Living people
Moroccan emigrants to the United States
Year of birth missing (living people)